Edward Birch Reynardson (1812-1896) was an officer of the British Army who served during the Crimean War and commanded the Grenadier Guards during the Siege of Sevastopol.

References 

Edward
1812 births
1896 deaths
Grenadier Guards officers
British Army personnel of the Crimean War